To compromise is to make a deal between different parties where each party gives up part of their demand.  In arguments, compromise is a concept of finding agreement through communication, through a mutual acceptance of terms—often involving variations from an original goal or desires. Defining and finding the best possible compromise is an important problem in fields like game theory and the voting system.

Research has indicated that suboptimal compromises are often the result of negotiators failing to realize when they have interests that are completely compatible with those of the other party and settle for suboptimal agreements. Mutually better outcomes can often be found by careful investigation of both parties' interests, especially if done early in negotiations.

The compromise solution of a multicriteria decision making or multi-criteria decision analysis problem that is the closest to the ideal could be determined by the VIKOR method, which provides a maximum utility of the majority, and a minimum individual regret of the opponent.

Politics 

In international politics, the compromises most often discussed are usually regarded as nefarious deals with dictators, such as Neville Chamberlain's appeasement of Adolf Hitler. Margalit calls these "rotten compromises." In democratic politics, great challenges of contemporary democracy and has become more difficult in the era of the permanent campaign, as Gutmann and Thompson show. The problem of political compromise in general is an important subject in political ethics.

Politicians being willing to compromise can reduce partisanship and hostility. Politics is sometimes called the "art of compromise". Polling by the American Survey Center indicates that Americans take a favorable view of political compromise. 

Recently, Compromise is becoming associated with the new Center, as a way of reducing Political Polarization finding an Middle term that both sides can agree

Human relationships 
In human relationships, "compromise" is frequently said to be an agreement with which no party is happy because the parties involved often feel that they either gave away too much or that they received too little.  In the negative connotation, compromise may be referred to as capitulation, referring to a "surrender" of objectives, principles, or material, in the process of negotiating an agreement. Extremism is often considered as antonym to compromise, which, depending on context, may be associated with concepts of balance and tolerance.

See also 

Constitution
Connecticut Compromise (USA)
Compromise of 1850 (USA)
Compromise of 1867 (Austria-Hungary)
False balance
 Missouri Compromise (USA)
Three-Fifths Compromise (USA)
Trade-off

References

Arguments
Game theory